Walker Percy, OSB (May 28, 1916 – May 10, 1990) was an American writer whose interests included philosophy and semiotics. Percy is noted for his philosophical novels set in and around New Orleans; his first, The Moviegoer, won the National Book Award for Fiction.

Trained as a physician at Columbia University, Percy decided to become a writer after a bout of tuberculosis. He devoted his literary life to the exploration of "the dislocation of man in the modern age." His work displays a combination of existential questioning, Southern sensibility, and deep Catholic faith. He had a lifelong friendship with author and historian Shelby Foote and spent much of his life in Covington, Louisiana, where he died of prostate cancer in 1990.

Early life and education 
Percy was born on May 28, 1916, in Birmingham, Alabama, the first of three boys to LeRoy Pratt Percy and Martha Susan Phinizy. His father's Mississippi Protestant family included his great-uncle LeRoy Percy, a US senator, and LeRoy Pope Percy, an American Civil War hero. In February 1917, Percy's grandfather committed suicide.

In 1929, when Percy was 13, his father committed suicide. His mother took the family to live at her own mother's home in Athens, Georgia. Two years later, Percy's mother died in a suspected suicide when she drove a car off a country bridge and into Deer Creek near Leland, Mississippi, where they were visiting. Percy regarded this death as another suicide. Walker and his two younger brothers, LeRoy (Roy) and Phinizy (Phin), were taken in by their first cousin once removed, William Alexander Percy, a bachelor lawyer and poet living in Greenville, Mississippi.

Percy was raised as an agnostic, but he was nominally affiliated with a theologically liberal Presbyterian church. William Percy introduced him to many writers and poets.

Percy attended Greenville High School and the University of North Carolina at Chapel Hill, where he majored in chemistry and joined the Xi chapter of Sigma Alpha Epsilon fraternity. He wrote essays and book reviews for the school's Carolina Magazine. He graduated with a B.A. in 1937.

Friendship with Shelby Foote 
After moving to Greenville, Mississippi, in 1930, Percy was introduced by William Percy to a neighboring youth his own age, Shelby Foote, who became his lifelong best friend. As young men, Percy and Foote decided to pay their respects to William Faulkner by visiting him in Oxford, Mississippi. However, when they arrived at his home, Percy was so in awe of the literary giant that he could not bring himself to speak to him. He later recounted how he could only sit in the car and watch while Foote and Faulkner had a lively conversation on the porch.
 
Percy and Foote were classmates at both Greenville High School and the University of North Carolina at Chapel Hill. Although Foote was not permitted to join Percy's fraternity because of his partly Jewish heritage, he and Percy stayed close friends during their two overlapping years. Foote and Percy went on dates together, made regular trips to nearby Durham, North Carolina, to drink and socialize, and they even journeyed to New York City during one of their semester breaks. When Percy graduated in 1937, Foote dropped out and returned to Greenville.

In the late 1940s, Percy and Foote began a correspondence that lasted until Percy's death in 1990. A collection of their correspondence was published in 1996.

Medical training and tuberculosis 

Percy received an M.D. from Columbia University's College of Physicians and Surgeons in New York City in 1941, intending to become a psychiatrist. There, he spent five days a week in psychoanalysis with Dr. Janet Rioch, to whom he had been referred by Harry Stack Sullivan, a friend of Uncle Will. After three years, Walker decided to quit the psychoanalysis and later reflected on his treatment as inconclusive. Percy became an intern at Bellevue Hospital in Manhattan in 1942 but contracted tuberculosis the same year while he was performing an autopsy at Bellevue. At the time, there was no known treatment for the disease other than rest. While he had only a "minimal lesion" that caused him little pain, he was forced to abandon his medical career and to leave the city. Percy spent several years recuperating at the Trudeau Sanitorium in Saranac Lake, in the Adirondack Mountains of Upstate New York. He spent his time sleeping, reading, and listening to his radio to hear updates on World War II. He was envious of his brothers, who were both enlisted in the war and fighting overseas. During this period, Percy used Trudeau's Mellon Library, which held over 7,000 titles. He read the works of Danish existentialist philosopher Søren Kierkegaard as well as Fyodor Dostoevsky, Gabriel Marcel, Jean-Paul Sartre, Franz Kafka, and Thomas Mann. He began to question the ability of science to explain the basic mysteries of human existence. He was influenced by the example of one of his college roommates, and he began to rise daily at dawn and go to Mass.

In August 1944, Percy was pronounced healthy enough to leave Trudeau and was discharged. He traveled to New York City to see Huger Jervey, dean of Columbia Law School and a friend of Percy. He then lived for two months in Atlantic City, New Jersey, with his brother Phin, who was on leave from the Navy. In the spring of 1945, Percy returned to Columbia as an instructor of pathology and took up residence with Huger Jervey. In May, an X-ray revealed a resurgence of the bacillus. On April 12, Percy boarded a train for Wallingford, Connecticut, to stay at Gaylord Farm Sanatorium.

Years later, Percy reflected on his illness with more fondness than he had then felt at the time: "I was the happiest man ever to contract tuberculosis, because it enabled me to get out of Bellevue and quit medicine."

Career

Early career
In 1935, during the winter term of Percy's sophomore year at Chapel Hill, he contributed four pieces to The Carolina Magazine. According to scholars such as Jay Tolson, Percy proved his knowledge and interest in the good and the bad that accompany contemporary culture with his first contributions. Percy's personal experiences at Chapel Hill are portrayed in his first novel, The Moviegoer (1961), through the protagonist Binx Bolling. During the years that Percy spent in his fraternity, Sigma Alpha Epsilon, he "became known for his dry wit," which is how Bolling is described by his fraternity brothers in The Moviegoer.

Percy had begun in 1947 or 1948 to write a novel called The Charterhouse, which was not published and Percy later destroyed. He worked on a second novel, The Gramercy Winner, which 
also was never published.

Percy's literary career as a Catholic writer began in 1956, with an essay about race in the Catholic magazine Commonweal. The essay "Stoicism in the South" condemned Southern segregation and demanded a larger role for Christian thought in Southern life.

Later career 
After many years of writing and rewriting in collaboration with editor Stanley Kauffmann, Percy published his first novel, The Moviegoer, in 1961. Percy later wrote of the novel that it was the story of "a young man who had all the advantages of a cultivated old-line southern family: a feel for science and art, a liking for girls, sports cars, and the ordinary things of the culture, but who nevertheless feels himself quite alienated from both worlds, the old South and the new America."

Later works included The Last Gentleman (1966), Love in the Ruins (1971), Lancelot (1977), The Second Coming (1980), and The Thanatos Syndrome in 1987. Percy's personal life and family legends provided inspiration and played a part in his writing. The Thanatos Syndrome features a story about one of Percy's ancestors that was taken from a family chronicle written by Percy's uncle, Will Percy. Percy's vision for the plot of The Second Coming came to him after an old fraternity brother visited him in the 1970s. He told Percy the story of his life where he is burned out and does not know what to do next. The trend of Percy's personal life influencing his writing seemingly held true throughout his literary career, beginning with his first novel. Percy also published a number of nonfiction works exploring his interests in semiotics and existentialism, his most popular work being Lost in the Cosmos.

In 1975, Percy published a collection of essays, The Message in the Bottle: How Queer Man Is, How Queer Language Is, and What One Has to Do with the Other. Percy attempted to forge a connection between the idea of Judeo-Christian ethics and rationalized science and behavioralism. According to scholars such as Anne Berthoff and Linda Whitney Hobson, Percy presented a new way of viewing the struggles of the common man by his specific use of anecdotes and language.

Percy taught and mentored younger writers. While teaching at Loyola University of New Orleans, he was instrumental in getting John Kennedy Toole's novel A Confederacy of Dunces published in 1980. That was more than a decade after Toole committed suicide, despondent about being unable to get recognition for his book. Set in New Orleans, it won the Pulitzer Prize for Fiction, which was posthumously awarded to Toole.

In 1987, Percy, along with 21 other noted authors, met in Chattanooga, Tennessee, to create the Fellowship of Southern Writers.

Personal life 
Percy married Mary Bernice Townsend, a medical technician, on November 7, 1946. Both studied Catholicism and were received into the Roman Catholic Church in 1947. Fearing that Percy was sterile, the married couple adopted a first daughter, Mary Pratt, but later conceived a second daughter, Ann, who became deaf at an early age. The family settled in the suburb of Covington, Louisiana, across Lake Pontchartrain from New Orleans. Percy's wife and one of their daughters later had a bookstore, where the writer often worked in an office on the second floor.

Illness and death 
Percy underwent an operation for prostate cancer on March 10, 1988, but it had already metastasized to surrounding tissue and lymph nodes. In July 1989, he volunteered his doctors at the Mayo Clinic, in Rochester, Minnesota, to use experimental medicines. Percy enrolled in a pilot study to test the effects of the drugs interferon and fluorouracil in cancer patients. In his correspondence with Foote, Percy expressed frustration over the constant travel and hospital stays: "Hospitals are no place for anyone, let alone a sick man." Although the side effects of the experimental treatment were debilitating, Percy had a revelation when he saw children with cancer waiting in the lounges. He decided to continue the treatment at Mayo as long as he could so that the results of his treatment might some day be of value to others.

He died of prostate cancer at his home in Covington in 1990, eighteen days before his 74th birthday. He is buried on the grounds of St. Joseph Benedictine Abbey, in St. Benedict, Louisiana. He had become a secular oblate of the Abbey's monastic community, making his final oblation on February 16, 1990, less than three months before his death.

Legacy and honors

Influence 
Percy's work, which often features protagonists facing displacement, influenced other Southern authors. According to scholar Farrell O'Gorman, Percy's vision helped bring a fundamental change in southern literature where authors began to use characters concerned with "a sense of estrangement". His writing serves as an example for contemporary southern writers who attempt to combine elements of history, religion, science, and the modern world. Scholars such as Jay Tolson state that Percy's frequent use of characters facing spiritual loneliness in the modern world helped introduce different ways of writing in the south post-war.

Awards and honors 
In 1962, Percy was awarded the National Book Award for Fiction for his first novel, The Moviegoer.

In 1985, Percy was awarded the St. Louis Literary Award from the Saint Louis University Library Associates.

In 1989, the University of Notre Dame awarded Percy its Laetare Medal, which is bestowed annually to a Catholic "whose genius has ennobled the arts and sciences, illustrated the ideals of the Church, and enriched the heritage of humanity".

Also in 1989, the National Endowment for the Humanities chose him as the winner for the Jefferson Lecture in the Humanities. He read his essay, "The Fateful Rift: The San Andreas Fault in the Modern Mind".

Loyola University New Orleans has multiple archival and manuscript collections related to Percy's life and work.

In 2019, a Mississippi Writers Trail historical marker was installed in Greenville, Mississippi, to honor Percy's literary contributions.

Works

Novels 
 The Moviegoer. New York: Knopf, 1961; reprinted Avon, 1980 — winner of the National Book Award
 The Last Gentleman. New York: Farrar, Straus, 1966; reprinted Avon, 1978.
 Love in the Ruins: The Adventures of a Bad Catholic at a Time Near the End of the World. New York: Farrar, Straus, 1971; reprinted Avon, 1978.
 Lancelot. New York: Farrar, Straus, 1977.
 The Second Coming. New York: Farrar, Straus, 1980.
 The Thanatos Syndrome. New York: Farrar, Straus, 1987.

Nonfiction 
Several of the following texts are mere pamphlets, reprinted in Signposts in a Strange Land (ed. Samway).
 The Message in the Bottle: How Queer Man Is, How Queer Language Is, and What One Has to Do with the Other. New York: Farrar, Straus, 1975.
 Going Back to Georgia. Athens: University of Georgia, 1978 (also in Signposts, 1991.)
 Questions They Never Asked Me. Northridge, California: Lord John Press, 1979 (also in Signposts, 1991.)
 Bourbon. Winston-Salem, North Carolina: Palaemon Press, 1982 (also in Signposts, 1991.)
 Lost in the Cosmos: The Last Self-Help Book. New York: Farrar, Straus, 1983.
 How to Be an American Novelist in Spite of Being Southern and Catholic. Lafayette: University of Southwestern Louisiana, 1984 (also in Signposts, 1991.)
 The City of the Dead. Northridge, California: Lord John Press, 1985 (also in Signposts, 1991.)
 Conversations with Walker Percy. Lawson, Lewis A., and Victor A. Kramer, eds.  Jackson: University Press of Mississippi, 1985.
Diagnosing the Modern Malaise. New Orleans: Faust, 1985. (Also in Signposts, 1991.)
Novel-Writing in an Apocalyptic Time. New Orleans: Faust Publishing Company, 1986. (Also in Signposts, 1991.)
State of the Novel: Dying Art or New Science. New Orleans: Faust Publishing Company, 1988. (Also in Signposts, 1991.)
Signposts in a Strange Land. Samway, Patrick, ed. New York: Farrar, Straus, 1991.
More Conversations with Walker Percy. Lawson, Lewis A., and Victor A. Kramer, eds.  Jackson: University Press of Mississippi, 1993.
A Thief of Peirce: The Letters of Kenneth Laine Ketner and Walker Percy. Samway, Patrick, ed. Jackson: University Press of Mississippi, 1995.
The Correspondence of Shelby Foote and Walker Percy. Tolson, Jay, ed. New York: Center for Documentary Studies, 1996.
Symbol and Existence: A Study in Meaning: Explorations of Human Nature by Walker Percy. Edited by Ketner, Kenneth Laine, Karey Lea Perkins, Rhonda Reneé McDonell, Scott Ross Cunningham. Macon, GA: Mercer University Press, 2019. Percy's previously unpublished book on his working theory.

See also
William Alexander Percy

References

Further reading
Allen, William Rodney, Walker Percy: A Southern Wayfarer. (UP of Mississippi, 1986).
Coles, Robert, Walker Percy: An American Search. (Little, Brown & Co, 1979).
 Desmond, John F. Fyodor Dostoevsky, Walker Percy, and the Age of Suicide (Catholic University of America Press, 2019).
Dupuy, Edward J., Autobiography in Walker Percy: Repetition, Recovery and Redemption. (Louisiana State University Press, 1996).
Harwell, David Horace, Walker Percy Remembered: A Portrait in the Words of Those Who Knew Him. University of North Carolina Press, 2006.
Hughes, Leonard, "The Great Gatsby’s Southern Exposure: Walker Percy’s Debt to F. Scott Fitzgerald in The Moviegoer," The Mississippi Quarterly, Vol.73, No. 4 (2021), pp. 479–505.
 
Marsh, Leslie, Walker Percy, Philosopher. Palgrave Macmillan, 2018.
Samway, Patrick, Walker Percy: A Life. Loyola Press USA, 1999.
 Smith, Brian A. Walker Percy and the Politics of the Wayfarer (Lexington Books, 2017)
 Tillman, Jane G. "The intergenerational transmission of suicide: Moral injury and the mysterious object in the work of Walker Percy." Journal of the American Psychoanalytic Association 64.3 (2016): 541–567.
Tolson, Jay, Pilgrim in the Ruins: A Life of Walker Percy. New York: Simon and Schuster, 1992.
Wood, Ralph C,  The Comedy of Redemption:  Christian Faith and Comic Vision in Four American Novelists.  University of Notre Dame Press, 1988.
Wyatt-Brown, Bertram. The Literary Percys: Family History, Gender & the Southern Imagination. Athens and London: University of Georgia Press, 1994.
_. The House of Percy: Honor, Melancholy and Imagination in a Southern Family. Oxford University Press USA, 1994.
 Swirski. Peter, "We Better Kill the Instinct to Kill Before It Kills Us or Violence, Mind Control, and Walker Percy's The Thanatos Syndrome".  American Utopia and Social Engineering in Literature, Social Thought, and Political History.  New York, Routledge 2011.
 Wilson, Franklin Arthur. "Percy Following Faulkner: A Different Path?." Renascence 68.4 (2016): 294–310. on Percy's fourth novel, Lancelot.

Primary sources
 Tolson, Jay, ed. The Correspondence of Shelby Foote and Walker Percy (W.W. Norton Company, 1997). online review by Louis Simpson

External links

Inventory of the Walker Percy Papers, circa 1910–1992, in the Southern Historical Collection, UNC-Chapel Hill

Bio, The Fellowship of Southern Writers
The Walker Percy Project: An Internet Literary Center
Walker Percy: From Pen to Print, a 2002 exhibit at the Rare Book Collection, UNC-Chapel Hill.
"Walker Percy", Encyclopedia of Alabama

Walker Percy's library, LibraryThing
Walker Percy: A Documentary
The Maple Street Book Shop Walker Percy collection at  The Historic New Orleans Collection

1916 births
1990 deaths
20th-century American novelists
American male novelists
American semioticians
Benedictine oblates
Deaths from cancer in Louisiana
Columbia University Vagelos College of Physicians and Surgeons alumni
Converts to Roman Catholicism from atheism or agnosticism
Deaths from prostate cancer
Louisiana State University faculty
National Book Award winners
Writers from Birmingham, Alabama
People from Covington, Louisiana
People from Greenville, Mississippi
Roman Catholic writers
University of North Carolina at Chapel Hill alumni
Novelists from Georgia (U.S. state)
Novelists from Louisiana
Novelists from Mississippi
Laetare Medal recipients
Christian novelists
American Benedictines
Writers of American Southern literature
Burials in Louisiana
PEN/Faulkner Award for Fiction winners
Novelists from Alabama
Catholics from Louisiana
20th-century American male writers
Percy family of Mississippi
Members of the American Academy of Arts and Letters